A Compton telescope (also known as Compton camera or Compton imager) is a gamma-ray detector which utilizes Compton scattering to determine the origin of the observed gamma rays.

Compton cameras are usually applied to detect gamma rays in the energy range where Compton scattering is the dominating interaction process, from a few hundred keV to several MeV. They are applied in fields such as astrophysics, nuclear medicine, and nuclear threat detection.

In astrophysics, the most famous Compton telescopes was COMPTEL aboard the Compton Gamma Ray Observatory, which pioneered the observation of the gamma-ray sky in the energy range between 0.75 and 30 MeV. A potential successor is NCT - the Nuclear Compton Telescope.

Telescopes
Astrophysics